EHNA (erythro-9-(2-hydroxy-3-nonly)adenine) is a potent adenosine deaminase inhibitor, which also acts as a phosphodiesterase inhibitor that selectively inhibits phosphodiesterase type 2 (PDE2).

References 

PDE2 inhibitors
Purines
Secondary alcohols